The 2017 season was IFK Göteborg's 112th in existence, their 85th season in Allsvenskan and their 41st consecutive season in the league. They competed in Allsvenskan and Svenska Cupen.

Players

Squad

Club

Other information

Competitions

Overall

Allsvenskan

League table

Results summary

Results by round

Matches
Kickoff times are in UTC+2 unless stated otherwise.

Svenska Cupen

2016–17
The tournament continued from the 2016 season.

Kickoff times are in UTC+1.

Group stage

Knockout stage

2017–18
The tournament continued into the 2018 season.

Qualification stage

Non competitive

Pre-season
Kickoff times are in UTC+1 unless stated otherwise.

Mid-season

References

IFK Göteborg seasons
IFK Goteborg